Anisopodus arachnoides is a species of beetle in the family Cerambycidae that was described by Audinet-Serville in 1835.

References

Anisopodus
Beetles described in 1835